Care is the fourth studio album by American musician How to Dress Well, released on September 23, 2016 by the Domino Recording Company.

Release
The album was preceded by the singles "Lost Youth/Lost You", "What's Up", and "Can't You Tell".

Critical reception

Care received generally favorable reviews from contemporary music critics. At Metacritic, which assigns a normalized rating out of 100 to reviews from mainstream critics, the album received an average score of 75, based on 16 reviews, which indicates "generally favorable reviews".

Track listing

Charts

References

2016 albums
How to Dress Well albums
Domino Recording Company albums